László Pecha (born October 26, 1963) is a Hungarian footballer who played as a midfielder.

Club career
In July 1990, he joined Pohang Steelers (then known as the POSCO Atoms) of the South Korean K League together with Géza Mészöly.

References

External links
 László Pecha profile at Magyarfutball.hu
 László Pecha profile at Nela.hu
 

1963 births
Living people
Hungarian footballers
Association football midfielders
Vasas SC players
K League 1 players
Pohang Steelers players
Hungarian expatriate footballers
Hungarian expatriate sportspeople in South Korea
Expatriate footballers in South Korea